Hong Kong League Cup 2005–06 is the 6th staging of the Hong Kong League Cup.

Group stage
All times are Hong Kong Time (UTC+8).

Group A

Group B

Knockout stage

Bracket

Semi-finals

Final

Scorers

4 goals
  Fabio Lopes Alcantara of Happy Valley
  Keith Gumbs of Kitchee

3 goals
  Julius Akosah of Xiangxue Sun Hei
  Cheung Kin Fung of Kitchee
  Chao Pengfei of Citizen

2 goals
  Lico of Xiangxue Sun Hei
  Lee Kin Wo of Xiangxue Sun Hei
  Chan Yiu Lun of Xiangxue Sun Hei
  Lo Chi Kwan of Xiangxue Sun Hei
  Cristiano Preigchadt Cordeiro of Xiangxue Sun Hei
  Lai Ka Fai of Citizen
  Ho Min Tong of Hong Kong 08

1 goal
  Evanor João Fantin of Happy Valley
  Leung Chun Pong of Citizen
  Jose Ricardo Rambo of Happy Valley
  Wang Gang of Dongguan Lanwa
  Karikari Godfred of Buler Rangers
  Chan Siu Ki of Kitchee
  Wilfed Ndzedzeni Bamnjo of Kitchee
  Gerard Ambassa Guy of Happy Valley
  Poon Yiu Cheuk of Happy Valley
  Wong Chun Yue of South China
  Sham Kwok Keung of Happy Valley
  Yuan Yang of Citizen
  Wisdom Fofo Agbo of Buler Rangers
  Chan Ho Man of Xiangxue Sun Hei
  Lam Ka Wai of Buler Rangers
  Ye Nan of Dongguan Lanwa
  Cornelius Udebuluzor of Buler Rangers

Individual Awards
 Best Defensive Player:  Cheung Kin Fung of Kitchee 
 Best Attacking Player:  Keith Gumbs of Kitchee

References

 www.rsssf.com Hongkong 2005/06

2005 domestic association football cups
Lea
2005-06